Rowan Reda Araby or Rowan Elaraby (born 29 July 2000 in Alexandria) is an Egyptian professional squash player. As of April 2022, she was ranked number 8 in the world.

Araby won the 2022 Carol Weimoller Women's Squash Championship, after defeating Malaysian player Sivasanjari Subramaniam 3–1, for the first time in her history. Araby is the 2017 World Junior Champion beating Egyptian compatriot, Hania El Hammamy. The previous year, 2016, Araby lost in the final to Nouran Gohar.

See also 
 Official Women's Squash World Ranking

References

2000 births
Living people
Egyptian female squash players
21st-century Egyptian women